Search for a Method or The Problem of Method is a 1957 essay by the philosopher Jean-Paul Sartre, in which the author attempts to reconcile Marxism with existentialism. The first version of the essay was published in the Polish journal Twórczość; an adapted version appeared later that year in Les Temps modernes, and later served as an introduction for Sartre's Critique of Dialectical Reason (Paris, 1960). Sartre argues that existentialism and Marxism are compatible, even complementary, even though Marxism's materialism and determinism might seem to contradict the abstraction and radical freedom of existentialism.

Summary

Marxism and Existentialism 
Sartre's opening chapter discusses the relationship between Marxism and existentialism.  Sartre sees Marxism as the dominant philosophy for the current era of history and existentialism as a reinforcing complement.  Most of the chapter discusses how existentialism fails to stand on its own as a school of thought while Marxism has become corrupted by the Soviets and other orthodox Communists who abuse the system of thought.  Sartre sees existentialism as a reaction to this abuse.

Sartre opens his first chapter by defining philosophy.  He argues that there are many philosophies and that a current, active philosophy unifies all current knowledge and represents the "rising" class becoming conscious of itself. Sartre breaks modern philosophy down into three eras: mercantile John Locke and René Descartes, industrial Immanuel Kant and Georg Wilhelm Friedrich Hegel, and contemporary Karl Marx. Sartre classifies existentialism as an ideology instead of a philosophy since it failed to establish itself as an independent system of thought and did not establish itself as the conscious of a new class.  Early existentialism, represented by Søren Kierkegaard, did not stand on its own as a unified system of thought.  Instead, Kierkegaard's work stood only as the opposition to Hegel's.  The existence of Kierkegaard's thought depended on the existence of Hegel's since it is solely a reaction to it. Karl Jaspers also failed to establish existentialism in a place of historical importance since his theories are directed inward, toward the self instead of outward, to society.

Sartre then turns to his own experience with Marx.  He describes an early attraction to Marx's thought since it did a better job of describing the condition of the proletariat than the "optimistic humanism" that was being taught at university. Despite this affinity toward Marx's works, Sartre claims that his generation's interpretation of Marxism remained tainted by idealism and individualism until World War II broke down the dominant societal structures. Despite this apparent victory of Marxism, existentialism persisted because Marxism stagnated. Marxism became a tool for the security and policies of the Soviet Union.  The Soviets halted the organic conflict and debate that develops a philosophy, and turned Marxist materialism into an idealism in which reality was made to conform to the a priori, ideological beliefs of Soviet bureaucrats. Sartre points to the Hungarian Uprising of 1956 where Soviet leaders assumed that any revolt must be counter-revolutionary and anti-Marxist when, in fact, the Hungarian revolt came directly from the working class. In contrast to this inflexible mode of thinking, Sartre points to Marx's writings on the Revolutions of 1848 and the French coup d'état of 1851 in which Marx examined class relations instead of taking them as given. Sartre notes that his contemporary Marxists maintained a focus on "analysis" but criticizes this analysis as a superficial study focused on verifying Marxist absolutes ("eternal knowledge") instead of gaining an understanding of historical perspective, as Marx himself did.

Sartre turns his criticism on to other methods of investigation.  He says that "American Sociology" has too much "theoretic uncertainty" while the once promising psychoanalysis has stagnated.  Unlike these methods and the generally dominant idealism, existentialism and Marxism offer a possible means of understanding mankind and the world as a totality. Sartre claims that the class war predicted by Marxism has failed to occur because orthodox Marxism has become too rigid and "Scholastic". Despite its stagnation, Marxism remains the philosophy of this time. Both existentialism and Marxism see the world in dialectical terms where individual facts are meaningless; truth is found not in facts themselves but in their interaction: they only gain significance as part of a totality. György Lukács argued that existentialism and Marxist materialism could not be compatible, Sartre responds with a passage from Engels showing that it is the dialectic resulting from economic conditions that drives history just as in Sartre's dialectically driven existentialism.  Sartre concludes the chapter by citing Marx from Das Kapital: "The reign of freedom does not begin in fact until the time when the work imposed by necessity and external finality shall cease..." Sartre, following Marx, sees human freedom limited by economic scarcity.  For Sartre, Marxism will remain the only possible philosophy until scarcity is overcome; moreover, he sees even conceiving of a successor theory—or what one might look like—as impossible until the scarcity problem is overcome.

The Problem of Mediations and Auxiliary Disciplines 
Sartre opens the chapter by asking "Why, then, are we not simply Marxists?".  Marxism provides guiding principles and problems, but not knowledge.  Contemporary Marxists regard Marxist theory as a source of actual knowledge, but Sartre sees it only as a set of problems in search of a method. As in the first chapter, Sartre sees Marxism's flaw in rigidity: an "a priori" theory that forces events into "prefabricated molds." Sartre again turns to Lukács, his foil.  He ascribes to Lukács the opinion that the realization of German existentialism was Nazism while French existentialism can be dismissed as a petits bourgeois reaction to the German occupation. Sartre rejects Lukács' view by pointing out that, while Heidegger embraced the Nazis, Jaspers did not. Sartre also began work on his philosophy in 1930 and was wrapping up his work by the time of the occupation. He argues that, as a Marxist, Lukács is incapable of understanding Heidegger and existentialism. Marxism takes events and constructs universals, then imposes those universals on subsequent events.  Existentialism does not assume a single, real totality, but sees history as an interactive relationship between events and humans.

Sartre turns to the example of the French Revolution. While Marxists have argued that the complicated events of the Revolution can be broken down into class conflict, Sartre says the Revolution cannot be understood only on the terms of Marxist class analysis. He proposes a process of "mediations" to analyze how ideological and social factors guide the course of history, which is only indirectly influenced by economics and class.

Progressive-Regressive method 
Sartre proposes a method of thought that combines historical materialism with existentialist psychoanalysis.

Reception 
In the introduction to her translation of Search for a Method, the philosopher Hazel Barnes compares Sartre's views of Marx and Marxism to those of Erich Fromm, as expressed in Marx's Concept of Man (1961). The philosopher Walter Kaufmann argues that Sartre's embrace of Marxism represents the end of existentialism, since following the publication of Search for a Method, neither Sartre nor any other major thinker writes as an existentialist (though Kaufmann adds that existentialism understood in a looser sense continues).

References

External links 
 Chapter 1 of Search for a Method: Marxism & Existentialism
 Chapter 2 of Search for a Method: The Problem of Mediations & Auxiliary Disciplines
 "Existentialism" by Georg Lukács (referred to by Sartre as "Existentialism or Marxism"

1957 essays
Books about Marxism
Books by Jean-Paul Sartre
Éditions Gallimard books
French non-fiction books
Philosophy essays
Works originally published in literary magazines
Works originally published in Polish magazines